Rubus cockburnianus, the white-stemmed bramble, is a species of flowering plant in the family Rosaceae. It is endemic to China. It was named by the botanist William Hemsley to honour the Cockburn family.

This bramble is a shrub growing up to 3 meters tall. The smaller branches are brown or reddish, hairless, waxy, and armed sparsely with prickles. The leaves are divided into several serrated leaflets which are hairless or slightly hairy on the upper surfaces and woolly-haired underneath. Inflorescences occur in the axils and at the ends of branches. The pink flowers are about one centimeter wide and have many stamens in their centers. The purple-black aggregate fruit is under a centimeter long.

The native habitat of the plant includes forests, thickets, and riverbanks.

In cultivation it is valued for its vivid white winter branches. It can be used as a security barrier, quickly becoming an impenetrable thicket. Cultivars for garden use include 'Goldenvale'. It has yellow foliage, white branchlets, purple flowers, and black fruits. It has gained the Royal Horticultural Society’s Award of Garden Merit.

References

External links
 

cockburnianus
Endemic flora of China